Sparkling wine production is the method of winemaking used to produce sparkling wine. The oldest known production of sparkling wine took place in 1531 with the ancestral method.

Pressure and terminology
In popular parlance and also in the title of this article the term sparkling is used for all wines that produce bubbles at the surface after opening. Under EU law the term sparkling has a special meaning that does not include all wines that produce bubbles. For this reason the terms fizzy and effervescent are sometimes used to include all bubbly wines.

The following terms are increasingly used to designate different bottle pressures:
Semi-sparkling wines include wines labelled as Frizzante, Spritzig, Pétillant and Pearl.
 Sparkling is a wine with above  of pressure. This is the only wine that can be labelled as sparkling under EU law. Sparkling wines include wines labelled as Champagne, Cava, Mousseux, Crémant, Espumoso, Sekt and Spumante.

Production methods

Fermentation of sugar into alcohol during winemaking always means that carbon dioxide is released. Carbon dioxide has the property of being very soluble in water (the main constituent of wine), a property that is utilized in sparkling wines. Production always starts from a base wine (where the carbon dioxide from the first fermentation has been gasified). In Champagne production, the base wine is usually a blend of wines from different grape varieties and different wineries, where the distribution gives the final wine its special character, called cuvée. In some commonly used methods the base wine undergoes a secondary fermentation, which encloses the resulting carbon dioxide under excess pressure and binds it to the liquid in the sparkling wine. In this way the carbon dioxide content is created which, after opening the bottle, produces the bubbles. The dead yeast cells form a precipitate called lees, that often help with appealing aromas to the sparkling wine but looks unappetizing. The lees are therefore normally removed before the wine is distributed.

There is some consensus that the methods, where the second fermentation occurs in the bottle, are usually preferable to others. Which production method that gives the best wine is not a moot point.

The following table shows the main features of seven main methods used to make sparkling wines. The methods are then described in the text. Within each method there may be variations from one producer to another.

Traditional method

 
The so-called classic way (though not the oldest) to produce sparkling wine is popularly known as the traditional method, or the official EU designation, classic method. In 1994 the designation Champagne method was disallowed as it was too often involved in  passing off. As the former designation suggests, the method is used for the production of most Champagne, and it is slightly more expensive than the Charmat method. Champagne in bottles of 375 ml, 750 ml and 1.5 liters must be produced with the traditional method, but smaller and larger bottles are usually produced with the transfer method.

The wine is fermented once in the barrel and then undergoes a second fermentation in the bottle after the addition of yeast, nutrients for the yeast, and sugar (known as tirage). The second fermentation results in a natural sparkling wine. Yeast precipitate (lees) must then be removed. This begins with riddling which means that the bottles are turned with the neck downwards and lightly shaken to move the lees to the neck of the bottle. This is done in small steps where the bottle orientation gradually changes. Finally the inverted bottle necks are cooled so that the precipitation freezes to a small block of ice, the bottles are turned upright and the temporary closure (normally a crown cap) is opened so that the precipitate is pushed out by the pressure in the bottle. Then the bottle is filled to replace the missing volume, and fitted with a plain Champagne cork and halter. The process to remove lees is called disgorging.

Historically the various stages were performed manually but the whole process is now automated for most wines. In connection with the filling of the missing volume, it is common to add a certain amount of sugar dissolved in wine to give the sparkling wine a smoother taste. Sugar addition is called  and the added liquid .

In many cases the wine is stored on the lees –  – under carbon dioxide pressure for a long time before disgorging takes place, to get a more mature character. The requirement for non-vintage Champagne is at least 15 months of storage on the lees, and for vintage Champagne at least three years.

Ancestral method

This is by far the oldest method of making sparkling wine and preceded the traditional method by almost 200 years, or possibly even more. The wine that is now called Blanquette de Limoux is considered by wine historians to be the world's first sparkling wine, and was produced in Limoux in 1531 by monks in the monastery of Saint-Hilaire. Wines produced using the ancestral method include among others French wines from Gaillac, Bugey Cerdon and Blanquette de Limoux, German wines from a few vineyards where the method is usually called , and some North American wines. In Italy the name given to a traditional version of the ancestral method is Col Fondo, however producers are increasingly dropping the word from their labels as the name was trademarked in 2002 by two local wineries (as the spelling Colfondo). Although these wineries are not enforcing their trademark rights, they have been unable to come to an agreement with the Consorzio. Under new DOCG law, from 2020 Col Fondo wines will be labelled as Sui Lieviti. 

Wines made with the ancestral method are sometimes called , popularly abbreviated to pét-nat. Since French wine label regulations ban the word , the appellation from Montlouis-sur-Loire is instead called .

There are two general approaches employed by winemakers to produce pét-nat, the choice of which is often determined by location and weather conditions during harvest as well as the scale of production and resources on hand in the winery when it comes to bottling. The first is the "interruption" method, whereby the primary alcoholic fermentation is interrupted by the act of bottling. The wine goes into bottle, sealed under a crown cap, where the still viable yeast, nutrient and sugar allow the primary fermentation to continue and produce the carbon dioxide that forms the bubbles. Malolactic fermentation may also occur in bottle making a small contribution to the carbon dioxide levels. Unlike the traditional method there is no disgorging and dosage, however producers using the interruption method will often need to remove tartrate crystals and sediment to prevent the wine from gushing when opened as well as to reduce the amount of final sediment to an acceptable level. To accomplish this, the bottles are hand disgorged and topped up with the same wine. The interruption method is often favoured by producers in cooler regions where the fermentation is slower and easier to catch at a specific point and where they have the resources to hand bottle at a specific time and to hand disgorge. The second method is called "entr'acte" (intermission) whereby the primary fermentation is completed to dryness, allowing the wine to be naturally cold stabilised and settled, either in an underground cellar or temperature controlled tank. Sweet juice from a second pick of grapes, often from the same vineyard, is then added to the wine, which is then bottled with the fermentation from the second pick juice completing in bottle to produce the bubbles. The advantages of the entr'acte method is that the wine does not need to be disgorged, there is more control over final sediment and pressure levels leading to an avoidance of gushing. The entr'acte method is often favoured in warmer climates where faster ferments are more difficult to control, as well as where producers want to be more precise with final turbidity and pressure levels as well as minimising overall risk. Alternatively, using a method faithful to the origins of ancestral winemaking, the wine is cold-settled before the end of primary fermentation to mimic the natural changing seasons before being bottled and then allowed to warm up again, as it would in the Spring. This process, a traditional variation on the entr'acte practice, is called the "Overwintering Method," and is how the earliest sparkling wines would have come about, although as an intentional method of production it runs the risk of a stuck ferment.  

Styles of pét-nat can very widely, including a range of colours from white, red, pink and orange (not to be confused with skin contact orange wines). Pressure levels can also vary from lightly sparkling (around 1 to 2 bars of pressure), to a gentle foam (around 3 bar) to a full fizz (4 to 5 bars). Common flaws are often related to turbidity and pressure, with wines being barely fizzy to gushing. Common faults are those often associated with low / no sulphur winemaking such as mousiness or excessive levels of brettanomyces or volatile acidity. Due to the fermentation being completed in the bottle, pét-nats can often display funky characteristics, not dissimilar to still natural wines, and which represent a stylistic cross-over with traditional styles of sour beer such as lambics and gueuze. Wines can vary from being highly aromatic to relatively neutral depending on the grape varieties used. They often display relatively low alcohol content, although this is purely a winemaker decision. The wines are sometimes obscure from remaining lees (except those which have been clarified by disgorging). They taste best one to three years after bottling and do not develop with further storage. In general, the wines usually finish fermenting in bottle resulting in them being dry, although there can be some variability with final sugar levels. The method's main challenge is that the production process is difficult to control and therefore requires great skill by the winemaker. The keys to pét-nat production are mastering temperature, timing and turbidity. The volumes produced are very modest. High-quality wines produced with the ancestral method, often by small growers using organic farming principles, can be complex and very distinctive. Visual cues that distinguish pét-nat from other sparkling wines are a sparkling weight bottle, closed with a crown cap, with a wine that is often a little bit cloudy. Pét-nat can be enjoyed as an aperitif or with fruit dishes, however their growing global appeal is as the sparkling wine of choice in the natural wine movement.

Transfer method
The transfer method follows the first steps of the traditional method in that after primary fermentation the cuvée is transferred to bottles to complete secondary fermentation, which allows for additional complexity. When the secondary fermentation is complete and the wine has spent the desired amount of time in bottle on yeast lees (six months is the requirement to label a wine 'bottle fermented') then the individual bottles are transferred (hence the name) into a larger tank. The wine is then filtered, liqueur de dosage added, and then filled back into new bottles for sale. This method allows for complexity to be built into the wine, but also gives scope for blending options after the wine has gone into bottle and reduces the bottle-to-bottle variations that can be hard to control in the traditional method.

The name transversage method is often used as a synonym to transfer method, but is actually a slight twist to the latter. In the transfer method proper, the wine is transferred to a tank directly after ageing on lees, while in the transversage method, the wine is riddled and disgorged before transfer to a tank. Consequently, the transversage method doesn't need additional clarification before bottling.

Sparkling wines from New Zealand and Australia often use the transfer method. The method is used for sparkling wine sold in unusually small or unusually large bottles.

Dioise method
This method is used for Clairette de Die AOC where the method is officially designated as the original dioise process. In contrast to the ancestral method the yeast production is controlled by cooling. The dioise method is used in among others the Drôme valley in France, as well as for Asti Spumante produced in Canelli in the Piedmont region in Italy.

Charmat method

Charmat was developed and patented in 1895 by the Italian Federico Martinotti (1860–1924). The method was further developed with a new patent by the inventor Eugène Charmat in 1907. The method is now named after the latter, but is also called cuve close, metodo Italiano or the tank method. The wine is mixed in a stainless steel pressure tank, together with sugar and yeast. Fermentation occurs in a closed system, so  cannot directly escape to the atmosphere and dissolves in wine. When the sugar is converted into alcohol and carbon dioxide, the yeast is filtered and removed, and the wine containing the dissolved  is transferred from the close reactor vessel into bottles. The duration of fermentation affects the quality; longer fermentation preserves the wine's aromas better and gives finer and more durable bubbles.

This production method is widely used in the U.S., in Italy, especially in the Asti province, and in Prosecco wines, and in Germany to produce variants of Sekt such as Henkell Trocken. Charmat-method sparkling wines can be produced at a considerably lower cost than traditional method wines.

Continuous method
The continuous method is also called the Russian method. The secondary fermentation takes place in steel tanks with special rings, or with added oak chips. The wine circulates slowly and becomes reasonably clear before it is bottled.

Sovetskoye Shampanskoye, Soviet Champagne, or under European Union law Soviet sparkling wine, is produced by the continuous method in Russia and former Soviet Union countries.

Soda method
Simpler, cheaper sparkling wines are manufactured simply by adding CO2 to the wine from a carbonator. The bubbles created by using this method will be relatively large and volatile. In the European Union sparkling wines made via this method must use terms 'aerated sparkling wine' and 'aerated semi-sparkling wine', supplemented where necessary with the words 'obtained by adding carbon dioxide' or 'obtained by adding carbon anhydride.'

Wine faults
Several wine faults can occur in sparkling wine production. Some that were present in early production methods include yeux de crapauds (toad's eyes) which was a condition of big, viscous bubbles that resulted from the wine spending too much time in wooden casks. Another fault could occur when the wine is exposed to bacteria or direct sunlight, leaving the wine with murky colouring and an oily texture.

Notes

References

Sparkling wines
Winemaking

pt:Champanhe (vinho)#Método champenoise, tradicional ou clássico